Ulink College is an educational information consultancy company founded in Shanghai, China. It consists of one partner school (NCPA) and six full-time international boarding high schools across China. The international high schools offers IGCSE and A-Level courses, and the partner school offers Advanced Placement (AP) course. The partner school and international high schools are all taught in English.

History 

In 2003, Ulink College was founded based on the cooperation between Ulink's founders, Xunan Liang, and Cambridge Assessment International Education(CAIE). Ulink became one of the first education group that introduced CAIE curriculum into China. It took an important role in establishing Shenzhen College of International Education, the oldest public CAIE School in China.

In 2004, the first school of Ulink College was founded in Guangzhou. Followed by Ulink College Guangzhou, the other three schools have been established in Shanghai, Beijing, Suzhou in 2005, 2010 and 2010. In 2012, the partner school (NCPA) was established in Nansha, Guangzhou. On July 7 of the same year, Ulink College was issued with the “Outstanding Remark” by CAIE. In 2014, Ulink College Wuhan was established. In 2015, Ulink College was authorized by CAIE to be its first official professional development centre in China. In 2018, Ulink College of Shanghai was authorized by International Baccalaureate Diploma Programme (IBDP), which rendered Ulink College the few educational groups in China that can concurrently operate three international curriculums, A-Level, IB and IBDP.  In 2019, a new campus in Shenzhen was founded and is currently under development.

Ulink College, Guangzhou 

Ulink College Guangzhou was founded in cooperation with South China Normal University (SCNU) in 2004. The school was initially named Ulink College of International Culture of SCNU or SCUN International School. It was initially a part of South China Normal University and located in the Campus of SCNU, Guangzhou, China. Ulink College of International Culture was registered with Cambridge Assessment International Education and was a member of UCAS. The school was under the governance of the College of International College (CIC) managed by SCNU and offered four A-Level subjects including Chemistry, Mathematics, Accounting and Physics.

In 2010, Nanhai International Education centre of Ulink College Guangzhou was established. The Centre was situated in Guicheng Senior High School, Foshan, China. The centre offered a two-year IGCSE study. Students who finished IGCSE in this centre can directly head off to A Level study in Ulink College of International Culture. In 2014, Ulink College Guangzhou received "Ten Year Contribution Award" from Cambridge Assessment International Education. In 2015, both Ulink College of International Culture and Nanhai International Education Centre were moved to the campus of Yingdong Middle School, Nansha, China, and were named Ulink College Guangzhou, abbreviated as ULC. The new campus of Ulink College Guangzhou is 12.7 arches large and accommodates nearly 550 students from grade nine to grade twelve.
Ulink College Guangzhou is a member school of the Principals' Training Centre (PTC), International Schools Services (ISS) and Council of International Schools (CIS). Ulink College Guangzhou was registered with Cambridge Assessment International Education to be the examination and teaching centre for IGCSE and A-Level. Ulink College Guangzhou is also an authorized centre for Pearson EDEXCEL teaching and examination at IGCSE and A-Level. The school was authorized by the British Council as Aptis examination centre and was recognized as 'Aptis testing demonstration centre' in 2018.

Ulink College, Shanghai 

Ulink College Shanghai was founded in cooperation with Shanghai Normal University (SNU) in 2005.  The school was formerly named Cambridge International Centre of Shanghai Normal University and had its first campus located in the campus of SNU, Shanghai, China. In 2017, the name of the school was changed to Ulink College Shanghai. One year later, Ulink College Shanghai moved to its new campus located in 559th South Laiting Road, Jiuting Town, Songjiang District, Shanghai, China. The new campus is 7 acres vast and accommodates approximately 1000 students and 150 faculty members. The campus consists of a gymnasium, a 400-meter plastic runway, a laboratory building, an office building, a teaching building, a dining hall and a dormitory building.

Ulink College Shanghai was registered with Cambridge International Examinations to provide IGCSE and A-Level Course. In 2018, The school attained IB world School authorization. Later in the same year, the school received authorization from the International Baccalaureate Diploma Programme (IBDP) to offer IBDP courses.

Ulink College, Beijing 

Ulink College of Beijing was established in cooperation with Beijing Normal University (BNU) in 2010. The school was formerly named Cambridge International Curriculum Centre of Beijing Normal University and was originally located in the campus of BNU, Beijing, China. The name of the school was then changed to Ulink College of Beijing in 2017.  In March 2011, Ulink College of Beijing was authorized by Cambridge Assessment International Educations to offer IGCSE and A Level courses and conduct their examinations. Due to expansion in the number of students recently, Ulink College of Beijing changes its campus location and currently operate IGCSE and A Level courses in two different locations. The A Level courses are conducted in 1st DingFu Road, Xicheng District, Beijing and the IGCSE courses are operated in 16th MeiAn Road, MenTouGou District, Beijing.

Ulink College, Suzhou 

In 2010, Ulink College Suzhou was founded from the cooperation between Ulink Education Group and Suzhou Industrial Park Xinghai Experimental Middle School. In 2018, Ulink College Suzhou moved its campus to Dushu Lake Science, Education, Innovation District of Suzhou Industrial Park. The new campus is surrounded by twenty-nine international and domestic universities and many research institutions. Ulink College Suzhou had made use of the education resources nearby for improving its school's characteristics and quality.

Ulink College Suzhou was authorized by both Pearson Edexcel and Cambridge Assessment International Education to provide teaching and examination at IGCSE and A-Level.

Ulink College, Wuhan 

Ulink College Wuhan, full name as Wuhan Ulink College of China optical valley was founded in 2014. Its campus was located in No.1 Fushikang West Road, East Lake High-Tech Development Zone, Wuhan. The ratio between teachers and students is one to four and the foreign teachers have taken up more than 50% of the total number of faculty members. The school was accredited by Cambridge Assessment International Education to offer IGCSE and A-Level courses and exams. The school currently opens seventeen subjects' curriculums ranging from language, humanities to arts and science.

Partner School (NCPA) 

In 2010, Ulink College and International Schools Services formed a joint partnership for developing the innovative education system in China.  In August 2012, Nansha College Preparatory Academy (NCPA) was opened by this newly formed partnership. NCPA was authorized by College Board to provide teaching and examinations for Advanced Placement (AP) courses. The students in NCPA held Chinese identities and studied in an entirely English environment.

Academic 
Over the last 15 years, Ulink College has produced 136 students from Oxford and Cambridge as well as over 30 students from top 30 USA universities.

Ulink College was the member of International Recruitment Conferences (IRC), initiated by International School Services (ISS). It attended IRC each year to recruit qualified foreign teachers. The general requirements for teacher recruitment are bachelor's degree or above in relevant subjects, a teaching qualification recognized by CAIE, a background in education English and good command of written and oral English.

The general entry requirement of students are appropriate age (15 for G9 students, 16 for G10 and 17 for G11), up to standard of English and Mathematics indicated by their performance on English and Mathematics Entrance Examinations, as well as good language communication ability, attitude and learning enthusiasm, evaluated during the face-to-face school interview.

Ulink College provides top-up programs to support students from Grade 11 to Grade 12 with their college and career planning, which includes the help and guidance on personal statement writing,  university applications, university admission test, and interview training.

Ulink College has also carried out peer tutor programs for many years, where senior students volunteer to help junior students with their specific academic subjects.

Organization and administration 
Ulink College of Guangzhou was primitively under the organization of Ulink educational group and College of International College (CIC) managed by SCNU. After moving to its new campus in 2015, Ulink College of Guangzhou became only under the administration of Ulink educational group.

Ulink College of Shanghai was initially under the governance of Ulink educational group and Shanghai Normal University (SNU). After moving from SNU to its new campus in 2018, Ulink College of Shanghai became solely under the administration of Ulink educational group .

Ulink College of Beijing was originally under the organization of Ulink educational group and Beijing Normal University (BNU). After moving to its new campus recently, Ulink College of Beijing now become under the administration of Ulink educational group.

The partner school of Ulink College (NCPA) was under the administration of both Ulink educational group and International Schools Services (ISS). Ulink educational group was responsible for marketing and public and government relations whilst ISS was responsible for the daily operation and management of NCPA, including assessment, instruction, and curriculum.

In terms of overseas activities, the exchange program to Cambridge Tutors College (CTC) London was managed by both Ulink Educational Group and CTC London.

Student life 

Ulink College invites many guests to give lectures each year to broaden students' horizons. In 2017, Cowser, James P., a professional player in American National Football League (NFL), has been invited to Ulink College of Suzhou to give a Mandarin lecture. Students were amazed by Cower's Mandarin so that they twice gave standing applause and could not cease cheering.

Ulink College holds many clubs and extracurricular activities. Ulink College of Suzhou has invited James P. Cowser to conduct football training, teaching the basics of catching and throwing the football. Ulink College of Guangzhou has created fifty-five after school activities and clubs ranging from culture and sport to science and humanities.

Ulink College provides students with various exchange programs. Ulink College of Shanghai had opened its summer-term exchange program to Cambridge Tutors College (CTC), a senior high school located in London, United Kingdom. In 2017, twenty-five students from Ulink College of Shanghai went to CTC exchange program and studied at CTC for two months as a part of the short-term courses provided for students from all over the world. CTC's Principal Dr Chris Drew praised Ulink's students for their commendable adaptability to the local culture and learning enthusiasm.

Notable People 
In 2017, Ruoque Mao at Ulink College of Shanghai had contributed to CCK-8 Essay as part of her school training program. Kenneth Fok Kai-kong, the current vice president of Henry Fok Ying Tung Group of Companies, is Chancellor of Ulink College's Partner school (NCPA).

Literature and popular culture 

Ulink College had an important influence on cross-culture collaboration in China. Its collaboration with International Schools Services that formed Nansha College Preparatory Academy represented a new way that foreign curriculum programs could take roots in China.

Ulink College regarded exchange programs as one of its popular internal cultures. The intramural exchange programs offers Ulink's students the opportunities to immerse themselves in different cultures and strengthen their adaptability to various cultures.

The campus of Ulink College Guangzhou and Nansha College Preparatory Academy was the main filming place of "We Roared Past Youth (Chinese: 那场呼啸而过的青春) ", an online drama of campus of youth theme. The drama was produced by Le Vision Pictures (Levp) in 2017, Quanwei Liu as the director, and was broadcast exclusively on Le.com (Chinese: 乐视网) in June of the same year.

References 

British international schools in China
Education in Shanghai
Cambridge schools in China